Africa's Connection STP is an airline based in São Tomé. In 2014 it operated scheduled and charter services to Central and West Africa. According to the airline's webpage it operated 3 Dornier 228 Aircraft.

Destinations 
As of May 2014 the airline had 6 destinations.

Fleet 
As of May 2014 Africa's Connection STP fleet consists of the following aircraft:

References 

Airlines of São Tomé and Príncipe
2014 establishments in São Tomé and Príncipe
São Tomé
Companies of São Tomé and Príncipe
Airlines established in 2014